Kinnigoli is a major suburb  in the outskirts of Mangalore Tehsil (Mangalore Township).  It is located approximately 32 km from Mangalore City, 5 km from Kateel (a famous Hindu pilgrimage centre), 8 km from Mulki (5 km from Mulki Railway station) and 17 km from the Mangalore International Airport.  Kinnigoli is a fast developing hamlet. 

Kinnigoli is well connected by road with buses to all major cities and towns of the region.  It is a central market place for surrounding villages like Mundkuru, Ellinje, Aikala, Kallamundkuru , Muchuru, Neerude, Kateel, Delantabettu, Nadugoodu, Attur, Panja Pakshikere, Kavatharu and Balkunje. A weekly market is held on every Thursday. Kinnigoli has got its own supermarket called Daily Needs equipped with fruits, vegetables, pulses, grains, frozen foods, juices, etc.

The majority of the people in Kinnigoli work in agriculture. Paddy is the widely grown crop and is mostly grown for consumption rather than sale. Cash crops like Areca nut and cashew are grown in small packets of agricultural land or on uncultivable hillocks. Mango, jackfruit and tamarind trees are scattered over the farm lands.

Kinnigoli is undergoing urbanisation and a real estate boom due to an influx of Indian expatriates returning to Kinnigoli (mostly from Persian Gulf countries). Kinnigoli has a hospital called Concetta Hospital which is run by the Bethany Sisters of the Little Flower, Mangalore.

The famous Indian philanthropist and cardiac surgeon Dr Devi Prasad Shetty was born in Kinnigoli.

Srinidhi Ramesh Shetty is an Indian model and beauty pageant titleholder who won Miss Diva–Miss Supranational India in the Miss Diva - 2016 and also Miss Supranational 2016 who hails from Thalipady Guthu, Kinnigoli,

In winter month, usually in January, buffalo racing competition called Kambala is held in the water filled, post harvest, rice fields named Kaanthabare-Boodabare Jodukare in Aikala, just about 3 km from Kinnigoli which attracts hordes of spectators including tourists. The competition attracts well fed and trained buffaloes from the twin districts of Dakshina Kannada and Udupi (formerly joint as South Canara), gold medallions along with cash prizes are awarded to the winners.

The other facet for which Kinnigoli is known for is its "Unity and diversity". Despite the presence of various religious groups like Hindus, Christians& Muslims and proliferations of Kanarese, Tulu, Konkani, and Beary languages, Kinnigoli has been free from any communal tension over the years. Each of the communities coexist very well and in some cases actively encourage and participate in the religious activities of the other.

Due to the fact that a sizeable number of Kinnigoli natives are Indian expatriates working abroad particularly in the Persian Gulf region, there has been a large influx of foreign remittances to the small town. So nowadays, one can find a large number of upscale
mansions and bungalows along the roads leading in and out of kinnigoli. However, despite the real estate boom, the ecosystem has been carefully preserved by taking care to see that trees are not destroyed and overall green cover remains untouched. As a result, the place still retains its green cover and eco friendly habitat. Some modern apartments have come up at Kinnigoli like Pinto's Golden Castle .  Kinnigoli has few options of hotels. Some good service apartments have cone up near kinnigoli church next to Marywale school called Pinto's Crystal Castle which offers furnished apartments with equipped kitchen. A nice place to stay for families in short stays at Kinnigoli.

There is a regular Kannada monthly magazine called Yugapurusha published from Kinnigoli.

There is a mall here with name KINNIGOLI PPPS MALL first of its kind. Its 14400sqft in size, containing daily items, groceries, garments and also housing a Multi- Cuisine restaurant.

Connectivity

Bus 
Kinnigoli has good connectivity of bus services. The buses are running to Mangaluru, Mulki, Udupi, Bajpe, Kateel, Moodabidre, Belman, Nitte, Balkunje, Palimar, Padubidre, Karkala, Kaikamba, Polali, Bantwal, B.C.Road, Pakshikere, Surathkal, Shirva, Belthangadi etc.

Air 
The nearest airport to Kinnigoli is Mangalore International Airport (IATA: IXE, ICAO: VOML) which is at a distance of around 17 km. Flights are available from here to all the major Indian metropolis like Bengaluru, Mumbai, Chennai, Delhi, Hyderabad and Middle East like Abu Dhabi, Bahrain, Dammam, Doha, Dubai–International, Kuwait, Muscat etc.

Railway 
The nearest railway stations are Mulki railway station which is at distance of around 6 km and Surathkal railway station which is at distance of around 13 km .

Notable People

Educational Institutes In Kinnigoli
 Pompei College Aikala 
 Mulki Ramakrishna Punja Industrial Training Institute Thokur (MRPITI) 
 Pompei PU College Aikala 
 Pompei Primary & High School Aikala
 Little Flower Composite PU College
 Rotary English Medium School ThygarajaNagar Moorukaveri
 Maryvale English Medium Primary & High School 
 St.Lawrence Indian School (CBSE)
 Shimanthoor Sharada Model English High School (CBSE)
 St.Mary's Central School (CBSE)
 Morarji Desai Residential School Kammaje, Kinnigoli
 Govt. H.P.School Guthakadu 
 Govt. H.P.School Padmanoor
Trellis Academy

Banking in Kinnigoli
 State Bank of India
 Axis Bank
 Canara Bank
 Bank of Baroda
 Union Bank of India
 Indian Overseas Bank
 HDFC Bank
 Federal Bank
 UCO Bank
 Karnataka Bank
 Mangalore Catholic Co-operative Bank
 S.C.D.C.C Bank
 St.  Milagres Credit Souhardha Co-operative Ltd
 S K Goldsmith Industrial Co-Operative Society
 Kinnigoli Vyavasaya Seva Sahakari Bank

Temples
Sri Mahammayi Temple Moorukaveri, Kinnigoli
Sri Mariyamma Temple Maaradka, Kinnigoli
Sri Rama Mandira Kinnigoli
Sri Mookambika Temple Shanthinagar, Kinnigoli
Sri Mahalingeshwara Temple Elathuru, Kinnigoli
Sri Adi Janardhana Temple Shimanthoor, Kinnigoli
Sri Laxmi Janardhana Temple Elinje, Kinnigoli
Sri Vishwanatha Temple Punaroor, Kinnigoli
sri lakshmi venkataramana temple talipady.
Sri Durgaparameshwari Temple, Ulepady, Kinningoli.
Sri Umamaheshwara Temple, Ulepady, Kinnigoli,
Sri Adi Janardhana Temple, Elinje, Kinningoli
Kantabare Budabare Janma and Karnika Kshetra, Guddesaana Ulepady, Kinningoli

Churches
Immaculate Conception Church Kinnigoli
Our Lady of Remedies Church Kirem, Kinnigoli

Mosques
Mohiyuddin Jumma Masjid Kinnigoli
Khiliriya Jumma Masjid Shanthinagar, Kinnigoli
Jumma Masjid Punaroor, Kinnigoli

References

External links 

Localities in Mangalore
Cities and towns in Dakshina Kannada district